Jacqueline Saturn is an American business executive and general manager of Harvest Records. Prior to her position with Harvest Records, she worked in various positions at Epic Records, including vice president of alternative radio promotion, senior vice president of rock and alternative promotion, and senior vice president of promotions.

In 2018, Jacqueline Saturn was promoted to president of Capitol Music Group’s indie label services division, Caroline.

Career

Saturn began her career with Epic Records in 1993 as an assistant in the label's promotions department. She became the vice president of alternative radio promotion in 1998 and senior vice president of rock and alternative promotion in 2005. In 2007, Saturn was promoted to senior vice president of promotion, responsible for the label's promotion strategies and supervising the promotion staff. She held the position until she left the label in 2013 after working there for 20 years. She left the label in July 2013. Upon her departure, a party was organized by Epic Records' chairman and CEO L.A. Reid to celebrate her work over the 20 years that she was employed at Epic. The party was held in the penthouse of the Dream Hotel in New York and attended by record executives that included Charlie Walk, Tom Poleman, and Joel Klaiman.

Saturn left Epic Records in 2013 to join Harvest Records, a subsidiary of Capitol Records Music Group. She joined the label as its general manager, a position she shares with business executive Piero Giramonti. Saturn previously worked for Capitol Music Group's CEO Steve Barnett for 9 years during her time at Epic.

In September 2018, Saturn was promoted to President of Caroline, Capitol Music Group's independent distribution and label arms service. Saturn will lead a 50-person U.S. team and work in tandem with Caroline's 11 international offices. She will oversee all aspects of Caroline business, including artist and label signings, partnerships and strategic alliances.

References

Living people
American business executives
Year of birth missing (living people)